Bibi Chowdhurani is a Bengali television serial telecast by Zee Bangla.

Plot 
The show was about a girl named Bibi who was a liar but ultimately the lies turned out to be beneficial for others. She is a compulsive liar. Her father is a politician. Her elder sister is to be married with a guy, so in order to rescue her elder sister she lies to her father about her sister, but she finds herself trapped in her own lies. Her father decides to get her married with the same guy. In order to avoid the marriage she lies to the guy that she is an alcohol addict, chain smoker, etc. but the guy falls in love with her as he feels that she is a pure girl.

Cast 
 Nibedita Biswas as Bibi
 Arnab Banerjee as Pratim
 Elfina Mukherjee as Mimi Chowdhury 
 Dwaipayan Das as Nilay / Nilu
 Ambarish Bhattacharya as Manohar Chowdhury
 Lopamudra Sinha as Mandira Chowdhury
 Tanima Sen as Bibi and Mimi's Grandmother
 Sourav Chakraborty as Dibakar Chowdhury
 Animesh Bhaduri as Pratyush Mitra
 Rumpa Chatterjee as Haashi Mitra
 Runa Bandopadhyay as Surodhwani Mitra
 Shankar Chakraborty as Prabhat Mitra
 Aditya Roy as Pratik Mitra
 Twarita Chatterjee as Ranjana Mitra / Ranju
 Sayantika Basu as Shulekha Mitra
 Rajat Ganguly as Pranab Mitra
 Soham Basu Roy Chowdhury as Gogol Mitra
 Basanti Chattopadhyay as Usharaani
 Dipanwita Banerjee as Priya Mitra

References

External links
 Website

Bengali-language television programming in India
Zee Bangla original programming
2014 Indian television series debuts
2014 Indian television series endings